Abū Marwān ʿAbd al-Malik ibn Ḥabīb al-Sulami (180–238 AH) (796–853 AD) also known as Ibn Habib, was an Andalusi Arab polymath of the 9th century. His interests include medicine, fiqh, history, grammar, genealogy and was reportedly the first to write a book on medicine in al-Andalus. By virtue of his exceptional knowledge he became known as the scholar of Spain.

Biography 
Ibn Habib was born in Hisn Wāt (identified with modern-day town of Huetor Vega) a village near the city of Granada in the year 790. He claimed descent from the Arab tribe of Banu Sulaym, hence he took the nisba al-Sulami. His father was attar ('druggist or perfumer'), likewise, Ibn Habib worked as a druggist alongside his father. He first studied in Elvira and then moved to continue his studies in the city of Cordoba, which at the time, was the capital of the Umayyad Emirate of Cordoba. In the year 822/3, Ibn Habib went on to perform the Hajj to Mecca with the financial support of his father. After performing the pilgrimage he stayed to study the Maliki school of fiqh in Medina and Egypt, there he studied under Ibn Abd al-Hakam and Abdallāh ibn al-Mubarak. Ibn Habib died after an illness in 853 and was buried in the Umm Salama cemetery in Cordoba. He left two sons: Muhammad and Ubaid Allah and an unnamed daughter.

Works 

 al-Wadiha (Compendium of Maliki Law)
 Gharib al-hadith
 Tafsīr al-Muwaṭṭaʾ  (Explanation of the Muwatta')
 Hurub al-Islam (Wars of Islam)
 Adab al-Nisa' (Women Ethics)
 As-Samāʿ  (The Sky)
 Tabaqat al-Fuqaha' wa Tabi'in (Classes of the Fuqaha and Tabi'un)
 Al-Taʾrīkh (Chronicles)
 As-Samāʿ (The Sky)
 Kitāb al-Waraʿ  (Book of Piety)
 Waṣf al-Firdaws (Description of Heaven)
 Mukhtaṣar fī al-ṭibb (Compendium on Medicine)

See also 

 List of pre-modern Arab scientists and scholars
 Medicine in the medieval Islamic world

References 

796 births
853 deaths
9th-century Arabs
People from the Emirate of Córdoba
9th-century historians from al-Andalus
9th-century physicians
Maliki fiqh scholars
People from the Province of Granada